Sitobion wikstroemiae, also known as Sitobion (Sitobion) wikstroemiae, is an aphid in the superfamily Aphidoidea in the order Hemiptera. It is a true bug and sucks sap from plants.

References 

 http://aphid.speciesfile.org/Common/basic/Taxa.aspx?TaxonNameID=1168871
 http://animaldiversity.org/accounts/Sitobion_wikstroemiae/classification/

Agricultural pest insects
Macrosiphini